Robert Ian Aonas MacInnes QC (23 July 1902 – 14 January 1972), was Sheriff of Lanarkshire and a Scottish Liberal Party and Scottish Labour Party politician.

Background
MacInnes was born the younger son of Rev. Dr Alexander MacInnes, Kirkliston, of Edinburgh. He was educated at the University of Edinburgh. In 1937 he married Mary Galloway Morrison and together they had one daughter.

Professional career
MacInnes was called to Scottish Bar in 1924. He was Sheriff Substitute of Ross and Cromarty and Sutherland at Stornoway 1934–40, of Argyll at Dunoon 1940–41, of Bute at Rothesay 1940–41 and of Lanarkshire at Glasgow 1948–53. He was made a Queen's Counsel (Scotland) in 1946. He was Sheriff Substitute of Lanarkshire at Hamilton from 1953–55.

Political career
MacInnes was Liberal candidate for the West Stirlingshire division at the 1923 General Election. He was Labour candidate for the Caithness and Sutherland division at the 1945 General Election. He did not stand for parliament again.

Electoral record

References

1902 births
1972 deaths
Liberal Party (UK) parliamentary candidates
Labour Party (UK) parliamentary candidates
Alumni of the University of Edinburgh